Marguerite Bolger is an Irish lawyer who has been a judge of the High Court since January 2022. She previously practiced as a barrister where she specialised in employment law.

Early life 
Bolger is from County Kilkenny. She was born to Elaine Murphy and John Bolger, who was Mayor of Kilkenny in 1999. She attended secondary school at Presentation Secondary School, Kilkenny and later received LLB and MLitt degrees.

Legal career 
She was called to the Irish bar in 1993 and became a senior counsel in 2009. She primarily practiced in the area of employment law. She has appeared in cases in the Supreme Court of Ireland and the European Court of Justice. Her clients included both employees and employers, including RTÉ, the Irish Society for Prevention of Cruelty to Animals, An Post, Cork City F.C. and the Central Bank of Ireland.

In August 2021, she was appointed by the Irish government to chair negotiations with hospital consultants about entering into the Sláintecare system.

She has written several legal texts, including the first edition of a book on Irish criminal law with Peter Charleton and Paul Anthony McDermott and the books  Sex Discrimination and the Law and Employment Equality Law. Bolger is a former chairperson of the Employment Bar Association of Ireland and served on the executive board of the Irish Council for Civil Liberties. She was re-appointed for a second three-year term as chair of the Panel of Enquiry at Trinity College Dublin in June 2020.

In 2016, her former assistant was convicted in the Circuit Court of stealing €28,000 from her.

Judicial career 
Bolger was one of five people nominated to the High Court in September 2021. Her appointment was delayed due to ongoing work on behalf of the State. She was appointed in January 2022.

References

Living people
People from County Kilkenny
High Court judges (Ireland)
Irish women judges
Alumni of King's Inns
21st-century Irish judges
21st-century women judges
Year of birth missing (living people)